Nice Life Recording Company is a Los Angeles-based record label and publishing company founded by producer Ricky Reed. Collectively, Nice Life artists and songwriters have won or been nominated for a wide variety of awards including Grammy Awards, American Music Awards, Billboard Music Awards, Country Music Association Awards, BET Awards, and iHeartRadio Music Awards.

History
Nice Life's launch was officially announced in March 2016 as a joint venture with Atlantic Records. Reed was initially approached by Atlantic CEO Craig Kallman in 2014 who proposed a partnership, citing producers who have worked closely with labels historically. The company's name was inspired by a phrase that Reed's former manager would use frequently. Soon after its formation, Nice Life added Lizzo as its first signee. Since then the label has added the Marías, John-Robert (in partnership with Warner Records), Junior Mesa, and St. Panther among others.

In September 2019, Nice Life entered into a joint venture with music publisher Big Deal Music Group (which has since been acquired by Hipgnosis) to administer their publishing catalog and contribute to new songwriter signings.

Artists
Label
Facing New York
John-Robert
Junior Mesa
Lizzo
The Marías
Nate Mercereau
Ricky Reed
St. Panther

Publishing
Bigman
Billy Lemos
Cara Salimando
DJ Stanfill
Joe London
John-Robert
King Garbage
Nate Mercereau
Phoelix
St. Panther
Tele
Tom Peyton

References

External links 
 Official website

American record labels
Record labels based in California
Music publishing companies of the United States
Pop record labels
Companies based in Los Angeles